The Portuguese World Exhibition was held in Lisbon in 1940 to mark 800 years since the foundation of the country and 300 years since the restoration of independence from Spain.

The fair ran from 23 June to 2 December 1940, held on the Praça do Império, and was attended by 3 million people.

Organizers
Augusto de Castro was the commissioner general, Júlio Dantas president of committee,  the master architect, António Ferro (director), and lead engineer Duarte Pacheco.

The exhibition was opened by President Carmona, with Oliveira Salazar also in attendance.

Contents
The fair was divided into three main sections of display: history, ethnography, and the colonial world.

Monument to Discoveries
A monument to the discoveries of Portugal Padrão dos Descobrimentos was designed by Pardal Monteiro and Cottinelli Telmo and erected in the Praça do Império (it was dismantled in 1943).

Nautical sports
A modernist restaurant and beer hall was designed by António Lino with guidance from Cottinelli Telmo. In 2014, it was remodelled to become a nightclub and bar.

Popular life
The pavilion of popular life was designed by Veloso Reis and João Simões and after the exhibition was refurbished and opened as Lisbon's Museum of Popular Art in 1948.

Brazil
The Brazil pavilion, named Independent Brazilian Pavilion, was designed by Raul Lino, with interiors by Roberto Lacombe. Its contents included a large photographic mural and a reading room with 5000 works. It had an art section including paintings by Lucílio de Albuquerque, Arthur Timótheo da Costa, Oscar Pereira da Silva and Candido Portinari.

Nau Portugal
Nau Portugal was a galleon replica, built by the Mónicas's Family Shipyard, it was exhibited near the Maritime Discoveries Pavilion. It suffered irreparable damage in the cyclone of 1941. After that, it was dismantled and transformed into a barge.

See also
 Portuguese colonial exhibition
 Exhibition of the centenary of the opening of the Ports of Brazil

References

World Exhibition
Belém (Lisbon)
Events in Lisbon
1940 in Portugal
1940s in Lisbon
1940 establishments in Portugal
1940 disestablishments in Portugal
Colonial exhibitions